Dino is a 1957 film directed by Thomas Carr, written by Reginald Rose, and starring Sal Mineo, Brian Keith and Susan Kohner.  It was an adaptation of a teleplay of the same name originally broadcast in 1956 on Westinghouse Studio One. The picture was released as part of a double feature in April 1957 and the running time is 94 minutes.

Plot
The film opens as Dino (Sal Mineo) is released from a juvenile detention center where he has spent several years for taking part in a murder of a night watchmen when he was 13 years old. He is brought by his case worker Mr. Mandel to Larry Sheridan (Brian Keith), a case worker at the local settlement house, for therapy. While initially hesitant to take on a new patient due to his heavy workload, he agrees to see Dino and continues seeing him after he meets the troubled young man.
It is revealed that Dino’s family life is problematic and that Dino has as much trouble liking himself as others do liking him. While he has been away, his brother has been involved with a gang and Dino is persuaded to become  involved in their next “job”, the robbery of a gas station.

Cast
Sal Mineo	...	
Dino Minetta
Brian Keith	...	
Larry Sheridan
Susan Kohner	...	
Shirley
Frank Faylen	...	
Frank Mandel
Joe De Santis	...	
Mr. Minetta
Pat DeSimone	...	
Tony Minetta
Penny Santon	...	
Mrs. Minetta
Richard Bakalyan	...	
Chuck
Molly McCart	...	
Frances
Cynthia Chenault	...	
Sylvia (billed as Cindy Robbins)
Rafael Campos	...	
Boy #2

Production
Bernice Block, made this film (her first) because she saw Reginald Rose's original television drama, then bought it because she "loved it.". Sal Mineo and Pat DeSimmone are the only actors to reprise their roles from the original teleplay. Mineo’s brother, Michael Mineo, was also cast in the film as Rico. This is the only film the two appear in together.

References

External links
 Dino in the Internet Movie Database

1957 films
1957 drama films
American drama films
Films directed by Thomas Carr
Films based on television plays
Allied Artists films
1950s English-language films
1950s American films